Chau Seng (15 March 19291977) was a Cambodian left-wing politician.

Seng was a Khmer Krom. Born in commune of Tri Tôn, Châu Đốc Province, Cochinchina (in present-day An Giang Province, Vietnam). He was a cousin of Chau Sen Cocsal Chhum. Educated in France, in Paris, he became a communist. On his return to Cambodia, he had become Norodom Sihanouk's private secretary. He joint the Sangkum on 13 April 1957 together with Hou Yuon and Hu Nim. In the same year, Chau Seng was elected a member of National Assembly. After that he was appointed under-secretary, and later secretary of state for education. In 1967, he was rector of the Buddhist University. Seng made a national attempt at Cambodianization, however it was failed.

After the Cambodian coup of 1970 in which Sihanouk was ousted by Lon Nol, Chau Seng served as the Minister for Special Missions of the GRUNK government, the Beijing-based government-in-exile that was formed as a coalition between Sihanouk and the communists.

Seng was arrested, tortured and later executed by the Khmer Rouge at S-21 prison in 1977.

References

1929 births
1977 deaths
Cambodian people of Vietnamese descent
Khmer Krom people
People from An Giang Province
Sangkum politicians
Executed Cambodian people
Cambodian communists
Khmer Rouge party members
People who died in the Cambodian genocide
Executed communists